Wankel may refer to:

 Wankel engine, a type of internal combustion engine using an eccentric rotary design instead of reciprocating pistons
 Wankel AG, a German company that produces Wankel engines for ultralight aircraft and racing cars

People
 Charlotte Wankel (1888–1969), Norwegian painter
 Felix Wankel (1902–1988), German engineer; inventor of the Wankel engine
 Georg Reinholdt Wankel (1843–1907), Norwegian politician
 Heinrich Wankel (1821–1897), Czech palaeontologist

See also
 Wenkel, a surname

German-language surnames